Annai Velankanni is 1971 Indian Tamil-language drama film directed by K. Thangappan. The film stars Gemini Ganesan, Jayalalithaa, Padmini and K. R. Vijaya. Kamal Haasan briefly appears in an uncredited role as Jesus Christ. It comprises three stories pertaining to Catholic beliefs. Velankanni, where the film is set, is a real village in India, and has a large church dedicated to the Virgin Mary and Jesus.

Plot
The story pivots around the centuries - an old Basilica of our lady of health at Velankanni village near Nagapattinam in Thanjavur district in Tamil Nadu. With the patron saint of the Basilica, Mother Mary performing in lives of the devotee is narrated as a flashback, the story involving Nurse Mary (Jayalalithaa) and Susainathan (Gemini Ganesan) is in the present.

Mary (Jayalalithaa) is a nurse in a hospital at Nagapattinam and is a devotee of Mother Mary of Velankanni. She narrates the story of Kamakshi (K. R. Vijaya), a milkmaid and her son Sundaram in Velankanni village to a child patient Baby Sumathi. Mother Mary appears before Sundaram, who is on his way to the landlord's (R. Muthuraman) house at Nagapattinam to deliver milk. The landlord, a bureaucrat, is an atheist. Sundaram gives milk to mother Mary to feed the Infant Jesus. The landlord is annoyed about milk and does not believe the story of "A Lady with a Child" that caused the shortage. A miracle occurs - the milk pot overflows spontaneously. The Mother Mary appears before the landlord and he becomes a believer, a devotee of Mother Mary; he generously helps his tenant Karuppayyan (S. V. Ramadoss) in the conducting of his daughter's marriage Chellayi (Srividya) to her rich lover (Sivakumar).

The story of Swarnam (Padmini and her lame son Raja (Master Sekhar) in Velankanni Village is narrated by Doctor Sundararajan (Major Sundararajan) to his assistant. Villagers often poked fun at Swarnam and Raja because of his lameness. On his way to the market to sell curds and milk, Mother Mary appears before Raja and cures him. Mother Mary assigns Raja the task of building a Church for her on the spot where she appeared before him under supervision of Priest Francis (S. V. Subbaiah).

Meanwhile, Mary rejects marriage proposals from young doctors in the hospital. She is waiting for mother Mary's Oracle to decide her marriage and the miracle occurs. Both Susainathan (Gemini Ganesan), the son of rich landlord in Nagapattinam and Mary have the same dream. Both of them are singing praises of the Mother Mary. The meet each other in the Church and eventually get married. While Mary is away from the hospital meeting Susainathan, the Kind mother attends to Mary's duties disguised as a nurse.

Cast

Srividya as Chellayee
Sivakumar as Rangaiah
Jayalalithaa as Nurse Mary
Gemini Ganesan as Susai Nathan
Padmini as Swarnam
Master Sekhar as Raasa, Swarnam's Son
Major Sundarrajan as Sudararajan, Head Doctor
K. R. Vijaya as Kamkshi
R. Muthuraman as landlord
Devika as Kannamma, landlord's Wife
Sachu as Candle Seller Woman
Manorama as Doll Seller Woman
 S. V. Subbaiah as Father Francis
Nagesh as Kannaiah
Thengai Srinivasan
Srikanth as Doctor Antony

Cameo Appearance

 Kamal Haasan as Jesus
 Baby Sumathi as patient
 S. Ramadoss as Karuppaiah, Chellayee's father
 Janaki as Velayee, Kamakshi's Neighbour
 I. S. R. as Thangaiah
 Gemini Balu as Mayandi
 Siva Sooriyan as villager
 A. Veerappan as villager
 Karikol Raju as villager
 G. Sakunthala as Annam
 S. Rama Rao as Sundaram
 V. R. Thilagam as Sundaram's wife
 Pushpamala in Cameo Appearance
 Master Prabhakar as Ayyakannu
 Suruli Rajan as Arunachalam, Village President
 Lakshmi Prabha as Susainathan's mother

Release and reception
Annai Velankanni was released on 15 August 1971. The film was later dubbed into Malayalam-language as Velankanni Mathavu released on 27 May 1977.

Reception
Kamal Haasan, who was the assistant director of the film appeared in a cameo as Jesus Christ in the scene. Where he carries the cross to calvary. The crucifixion scene with the background song Deva Maindhan is sung by T. M. Soundararajan. Besides the real location scene at Nagapattinam and Velankanni, the film was shot at AVM Studios and Saradha Studios. Abhayadev translated to Malayalam the dialogues written by Sam D. Dasan for the original Tamil - based on the screenplay of K. Thangappan. The cinematography done jointly by R. N. Pillai and B. B. Lucas was impressive and the scene shot around the Church at Velankanni impressed the audience.  K.R.Sadayappa Chettiar, film financier had a dream that he cast Jayalalithaa in the film opposite Gemini Ganesan. Jayalalithaa excelled in her role as a nurse. It was a multi-starrer movie, other popular stars who acted in the movie besides Gemini Ganesan, Muthuraman, Sivakumar, S. V. Subbaiah, Major Sundararajan, Sreekanth were Malayalam Star Vincent, Thengai Srinivasan, Rajan, Padmini, K. R. Vijaya, Srividya, Devika and Manorama. Srividya and Sivakumar paired first time in this movie.

Box office
B. Vijayakumar Stated in the article that the Tamil and Malayalam-dubbed versions were box office hits. Both versions were box office hits in Kerala.

Soundtrack
The music was composed by G. Devarajan, while the lyrics were written by Kannadasan, Vaali and Ayyasamy.

References

External links

1970s Tamil-language films
1971 films
Films about Christianity
Films based on Indian folklore
Films scored by G. Devarajan
Indian films based on actual events
Marian apparitions in film
Portrayals of Jesus in film
Portrayals of the Virgin Mary in film
Christian mass media in India